XHMR-FM is a radio station in Aguascalientes, Aguascalientes. It is owned by the Instituto Mendel, a Catholic primary, secondary and bachillerato school, and broadcasts a cultural and Catholic radio format on 103.7 FM as "Estéreo Mendel".

References

Radio stations in Aguascalientes
Mass media in Aguascalientes City